The 2014 FBD Insurance League was an inter-county and colleges Gaelic football competition in the province of Connacht. As well as the five county teams, three colleges' teams competed: Institute of Technology, Sligo, NUI Galway and Galway-Mayo Institute of Technology (GMIT). Leitrim won for the second year in a row.

Format
The teams are drawn into two groups of four teams. Each team plays the other teams in its group once, earning 2 points for a win and 1 for a draw. The two group winners play in the final.

Results

Group A

Roscommon 1-14 IT Sligo 1-14
NUI Galway 1-6 Mayo 0-12
Mayo 2-8 IT Sligo 1-11
Roscommon 2-13 NUI Galway 1-5
IT Sligo 1-13 NUI Galway 0-8
Roscommon 1-10 Mayo 1-8

Group B

Galway 3-10 Sligo 0-8 
Leitrim 1-14 GMIT 1-11
Sligo 1-8 GMIT 0-8
Leitrim 1-10 Galway 2-6
Galway 0-13 GMIT 0-6 
Leitrim 1-12 Sligo 2-9

Final

References

FBD Insurance League
FBD Insurance League